Todo esto es muy extraño is the ninth album recorded by Spanish rock band Hombres G, released in 2005.  It is the first studio album to follow Historia del bikini, which was released 12 years earlier in 1992.

Track listing

Chart history

Personnel 

 David Summers – vocals, bass
 Rafa Gutiérrez – guitar
 Daniel Mezquita – guitar
 Javier Molina – drums
 Dani Martín - accompanying vocals on ¿Por qué no ser amigos?

References

External links
 Official website
 Discography

2004 albums
Hombres G albums